Law Garden is a public garden in the city of Ahmedabad, India. The market outside the garden is very famous for the handicraft goods sold by local people. The road at the side of the garden is filled with street hawkers selling a variety of food items.

Eatery market 
The eatery market, locally known as Khau Gully, was revamped and opened to public in 2020 as Happy Street.

The Law Garden eatery market would be regularized. The standing committee has asked the municipal commissioner to get the design and policy prepared. The regularization will help generate employment and will help the civic body to keep a close watch on the quality of food served there.

Gallery

References

Gardens in India
Culture of Ahmedabad
Geography of Ahmedabad
Tourist attractions in Ahmedabad